Two Men Went to War is a 2002 British war comedy-drama film based on a true World War II story, from Raymond Foxall's book Amateur Commandos which describes the adventures of two army dental corps soldiers who sneak off on their own personal invasion of France. The film was directed by John Henderson with a screenplay by Richard Everett and Christopher Villiers.

Plot
Sergeant Peter King and Private Leslie Cuthbertson of the Royal Army Dental Corps passionately desire to see active service, but are held back. Armed with two revolvers and a handful of grenades, they plan an unauthorised mission to occupied France. They write to the prime minister, Winston Churchill, explaining their intention to fight the Germans. After they finally succeed in getting to France, they stumble across a German radar station. They blow up what they take to be the main operations room, and then the entire compound unexpectedly erupts with gunfire and explosions. They narrowly evade the Germans and escape in a boat which is later blown up by a mine; the men are picked up by the British and interrogated as possible spies. Once their identities have been established, they are returned to barracks to be court-martialed as deserters.

An aide of Churchill had seen their letter, and knew of a commando raid on the radar facility which was facilitated by a diversion due to mysterious explosions in what they discover was actually the cookhouse. The aide intervenes in the court martial, establishes their presence at the enemy radar station and conveys an invitation to tea with the Prime Minister should they ever be in Whitehall. The court nevertheless demotes Sergeant King to the rank of corporal and remands Private Cuthbertson to military prison for 28 days, lenient sentences for desertion in wartime. A note on screen tells the viewer that the men never meet again.

Cast
 Kenneth Cranham as Sgt. Peter King
 Leo Bill as Pte. Leslie Cuthbertson
 Rosanna Lavelle as Emma Fraser
 Phyllida Law as Faith
 James Fleet as Maj. Bates
 Julian Glover as Col. Hatchard
 Anthony Valentine as SM Dudley
 David Ryall as Winston Churchill
 Derek Jacobi as Maj. Merton

Facts on King and Cuthbertson from the closing screen notes
King went on to fight in Europe against the Nazis and was awarded the Military Cross for bravery. He also served in the Korean War in the 1950s and was awarded the Distinguished Service Order before moving to New Zealand where he died in a car crash in 1962.

After serving his sentence, Cuthbertson was posted to active duty in wartime Europe. In later life, he became Deputy Lord Mayor of the city of Newcastle upon Tyne. He died in 1995.

References

External links 

Detailed plot summary

2002 films
British World War II films
British films based on actual events
Films scored by Richard Harvey
Films directed by John Henderson (director)
2000s English-language films
2000s British films